Die Sieben vom Rhein is an East German documentary film directed by Andrew and Annelie Thorndike. It was released in 1954. Thorndike made the film with his wife Annelie; it was made as part of the "Germans at the Same Table" campaign, and documented the visit of a West German workers delegation from the Ruhr to an East German steel factory is Riesa.
According to author Bert Hogenkamp, "even political opponents had to admit that Andrew and Annelie Thorndike had made a masterpiece".

References

External links
 

1954 films
East German films
1950s German-language films
Films directed by Andrew Thorndike
German documentary films
1954 documentary films
German black-and-white films
1950s German films